The Faculty of Mathematics and Physics of Charles University (Czech: Matematicko-fyzikální fakulta Univerzity Karlovy or Matfyz) was established on September 1, 1952, in Prague, Czech Republic. Since that time, the faculty has been represented by its students and professors both at home and abroad.

Activities and Achievements 

Among the recent collaborations belongs a participation in the development of the Solar Wind Analyser/Proton and Alpha Sensor (SWA-PAS) onboard the Solar Orbiter spacecraft, launching an educational game project based on comics simulations called Czechoslovakia 38-89 in cooperation with The Faculty of Arts and subsequent developing of a PC game Attentat 1942, making an AI translator called CUBBITT, which can compare to professional English human translators, establishing of the Malach Center for Visual History or the collaborating on a project dealing with AI system called DeepStack, which defeated professional poker players in 2016.

Moreover, The Faculty of Mathematics and Physics is a birthplace of Bird Internet routing daemon, IP routing daemon running mainly on Linux/UNIX-like operating systems etc., which began as a school project. Additionally, Matfyz also stood by a student project called Xelfi, which evolved in JAVA integrated development environment known as NetBeans. The Faculty of Mathematics and Physics has been also among teams of The CERN Experimental Programme for a long time and the participation in the programme is guaranteed for both the academic employees and the students. In 2021, the cooperative team of Matfyz, Švandovo divadlo and DAMU worked on the first theatre play written by AI, which had its premiere on the February 26, 2021.

The faculty produces approximately 25 % of all research outputs of Charles University.

Alumni/Graduates 

Notable graduates of Matfyz are for example astronomer Jiří Grygar or scientist Jiří Bičák, who was awarded by the Neuron Fund for his contribution to global science in 2014. In 2007, a minor planet 55844 Bičák was named after him. Further, Martin Klíma, a co-founder of a video-game developer Warhorse Studios known for a game Kingdom  Come: Deliverance.  Alice Valkárová, a former student and current professor of physics at Matfyz, was appointed as a member of the European Research Council (ERC) in 2021. Miloslav Feistauer, who is currently teaching at Matfyz as well, is a member of Learned Society of the Czech Republic uniting significant Czech scientists.

Departments 
 School of Physics
 Astronomical Institute of Charles University
 Institute of Physics of Charles University
 Laboratory of General Physics Education
 Department of Physics Education
 Department of Surface and Plasma Science
 Department of Physics of Materials
 Department of Low Temperature Physics
 Department of Condensed Matter Physics
 Department of Macromolecular Physics
 Department of Geophysics
 Department of Chemical Physics and Optics
 Institute of Particle and Nuclear Physics
 Department of Atmospheric Physics
 Institute of Theoretical Physics
 School of Computer Science
 Department of Software and Computer Science Education
 Department of Applied Mathematics
 Department of Distributed and Dependable Systems
 Department of Software Engineering
 Department of Theoretical Computer Science and Mathematical Logic
 Network and Labs Management Center
 Institute of Formal and Applied Linguistics
 Computer Science Institute of Charles University
 School of Mathematics
 Department of Algebra
 Department of Mathematics Education
 Department of Mathematical Analysis
 Department of Numerical Mathematics
 Department of Probability and Mathematical Statistics
 Mathematical Institute of Charles University

Photos

References

External Links 
 Official Website

Charles University
Educational institutions in Prague
Educational institutions established in 1952
1952 establishments in Czechoslovakia